Rodeo is a 2022 French drama film written and directed by Lola Quivoron. The film stars Julie Ledru as Julia, a young woman living in social housing who has a poor relationship with her mother; passionate about the sport of motocross, she tries to gain the opportunity to participate in the sport by posing as a buyer on shopping websites so that she can take bikes out for test rides. As she becomes drawn deeper into the urban motocross scene, however, she begins to participate in a bicycle theft ring.

The film premiered in the Un Certain Regard program of the 2022 Cannes Film Festival, where it won the Coup de Coeur prize and was shortlisted for the Queer Palm.

The film won the Golden Puffin Award at the 2022 Reykjavík International Film Festival. At the Seville European Film Festival, the film won the Cinephiles of the Future award and Ledru was cowinner with Zar Amir Ebrahimi of the award for Best Actress. The film won the Audience Award for the Altered States program at the 2022 Vancouver International Film Festival.

Rodeo was released theatrically in France on 7 September 2022 by Les films du losange. It is set to be released in select theatres in the United States on 17 March 2023 by Music Box Films.

Notes

References

External links
 

2022 films
2022 drama films
2022 LGBT-related films
2020s French films
2020s French-language films
Films set in France
Films shot in France
French drama films
French LGBT-related films
LGBT-related drama films
Motorcycle racing films